Sally Forster Jones is a Los Angeles-based real estate broker recognized as a leading expert of the luxury real estate market. She is frequently featured as a subject matter expert on national publications such as the Wall Street Journal, CNN, Reuters and appears on The Hollywood Reporter's Top Real Estate Agents rankings year after year.

Career
In 2011, Sally helped broker the $85 million sale of The Manor - a 123-room mansion in Los Angeles that had been built by the late TV producer Aaron Spelling. The initial listing of $150 million set a record at the time.

In 2014, Sally made Beverly Hills real estate history with the sale of 1181 North Hillcrest Road to her client Markus Persson, the Swedish creator of the Minecraft video game, for $70 million - the most expensive sale ever in Beverly Hills.

References 

Living people
American real estate brokers
Businesspeople from Los Angeles
People from Beverly Hills, California
Year of birth missing (living people)